The McLaren MP4/8 was the Formula One car with which the McLaren team competed in the 1993 Formula One World Championship. The car was designed by Neil Oatley around advanced electronics technology; including a semi-automatic transmission (which could be switched over to fully-automatic), active suspension, two-way telemetry, and traction control systems, that were developed in conjunction with McLaren shareholder Techniques d'Avant Garde (TAG). It was powered by the 3.5-litre Ford HBD7 V8 engine and was the first McLaren to feature barge boards. The McLaren MP4/8 was also first Ford-powered McLaren car since McLaren MP4/1C in 1983.

The car was driven by triple World Champion Ayrton Senna, in his sixth season with McLaren, and by Michael Andretti - son of  World Champion Mario Andretti - who joined Formula One from CART. After the Italian Grand Prix, Andretti returned to America and was replaced by the team's test driver Mika Häkkinen. Senna drove the car to victory on five occasions, finishing runner-up to Alain Prost in the Drivers' Championship, while McLaren were runners-up to Williams in the Constructors' Championship.

Ron Dennis in an interview described the MP4/8 as “one of the best cars we ever made”.

Engine
Honda had supplied McLaren with engines from 1988–92, the first four years where the team had dominated the drivers' and Constructors' Championships. However, Honda departed F1 after 1992 due to the worldwide recession and team principal Ron Dennis was unable to get a supply of Renault engines as a replacement.

With Honda pulling out of the sport, McLaren had to make do with customer Ford V8 engines which had inferior power compared to the V10 Renaults found in their chief rival Williams, and even the higher-spec HBA8 Ford V8's used by Benetton. Because Benetton had a pre-existing contract as the Ford factory team, McLaren initially had to settle for a customer engine which lacked some of the technological advancements of Benetton's factory engine; McLaren did secure a supply of the higher spec Ford engines after the British Grand Prix.

1993 season

Initially, Ayrton Senna was impressed by the car's handling and nimbleness, but he knew the customer Ford-Cosworth V8 to be underpowered compared to the Renault V10-powered Williams and he demanded a race-by-race contract at $1 million per Grand Prix, though others suggested that this was a marketing ploy between Senna and Ron Dennis to keep sponsors on edge and interested. Although the Ford-Cosworth V8 was lighter than the Renault V10, the power-to weight ratio of the Renault was greater than the Ford. 

However, the MP4/8 was competitive enough to achieve some remarkable successes. Even though rival Alain Prost was in the superior Williams FW15C, Senna's skill enabled him to lead the championship until after Canada, by winning 3 of the first 6 races, which consisted of his 2nd victory in Brazil, his 6th Monaco Grand Prix victory and one of his greatest drives in the rain-soaked 1993 European Grand Prix at Donington Park in England. Later in the season, the Frenchman asserted the dominance of his Williams to take the lead for good, while Senna fell off pace during the second half of the schedule and dropped to third place. While Prost clinched the championship with two races to spare, Senna went on to win the last two races in Japan and Australia. The Brazilian had five wins in total, and finished second in the Drivers' Championship to Alain Prost, whilst McLaren finished runners up to Williams in the Constructors' Championship.

The car scored 84 points during the season, 73 of which came from Senna, for an average of 2.63 per start. While Senna took the championship battle to the last few rounds, Michael Andretti had only a few points scoring finishes, including one 3rd place in his final race at Monza. Some factors were outside Andretti's control; with a restriction on the amount of testing teams were permitted in 1993, he never tested a Formula One car in the wet and a string of collisions meant that he only completed three laps in his first three races. Andretti also never came to grips with highly technical aspects such as active suspension and traction control, two "gizmos" not found in the simpler CART. Lastly, Andretti continued to reside in the United States, commuting to F1 races and test sessions. This also caused him to miss several test days. By mutual agreement, Andretti was released from his contract after the Italian Grand Prix where he scored his only podium for the team. To date this remains the last podium finish achieved by an American driver in Formula One.

At the next round, in Estoril for the Portuguese Grand Prix, Mika Häkkinen went on to out-qualify Senna (a rare occurrence for the Brazilian to be out-qualified by a teammate) and was in a competitive position in the race, dueling with Jean Alesi's Ferrari. Häkkinen however, ran too close to the Ferrari at the 5th gear final corner, losing downforce and understeering onto the grass, and into the wall. For the remainder of the season he went on to score one podium, and another retirement from a competitive position.

MP4/8B
During 1993 the McLaren team built a modified version of the MP4/8, dubbed the MP4/8B, to be used as a test car for the Lamborghini V12 engine that had been in Formula One since . After a handshake deal between Ron Dennis and Bob Lutz of Chrysler (who at the time owned Lamborghini) at a motor show in Munich, the modified car carried the  V12 engine (dubbed the Lamborghini LE3512) that was also supplied at the time to the Larrousse team and had previously been used by both Lotus and Ligier with little success. Lutz explained that after four years in Formula One, Chrysler wanted to test whether the V12 had the potential to be a winner in F1.

Ayrton Senna and Mika Häkkinen tested the car at both Silverstone and Estoril, with the first test taking place at Silverstone on 20 September. The modified MP4/8B, painted white with no sponsorship logos other than Goodyear, took three months to re-engineer and stretch in order to fit the longer and heavier engine (the V12 was badged as Chrysler for the McLaren tests). After first driving the car Senna suggested to the engine's designer, former long-time Ferrari engineer Mauro Forghieri, that it would be better with a less brutal top end and a much fatter mid-range. Forghieri, who had enormous respect for the triple World Champion and valued his opinion, made the requested changes. This also gave the Lamborghini engine around  more than the V12 used by Ferrari, the only other V12 in Formula One at the time. The resulting changes to the V12 reportedly made the MP4/8B more drivable and much faster than before, even faster than the race version. According to reports at the time, the combination of the MP4/8B and the Lamborghini V12 actually proved more stable and easier on tyres than the Ford powered MP4/8 race cars.

Both Senna and Häkkinen were reportedly very impressed with the car/engine combination, despite the 3512's poor reliability record since its Formula One debut and its poor reliability during the tests (the engine's best result to that point was a lucky 3rd place at the infamous 1990 Japanese Grand Prix, which would ultimately prove to be its best ever result). Häkkinen claimed that during the Silverstone test, one of the engines blew up as he was racing down the Hanger Straight. He claimed that right up to the point of detonation the engine was pushing out more and more power and actually felt much faster than the Ford. He also told that the blow up was very big with bits of the engine actually flying past his helmet. Senna later fueled rumours that the car would be raced during the 1993 season when he reportedly said during testing "It would be very interesting to race the Lamborghini in Japan". His belief was that regardless of reliability, the McLaren-Lamborghini would at least be as fast as both the Williams-Renaults and Benetton-Fords who he was struggling to keep up with in races using the customer spec Ford V8 (though Senna won in Japan using the Ford V8 and backed that up with his last ever win in Australia). Senna even allegedly rang Ron Dennis from the pits during the Estoril test (according to reports Dennis took the call in his private limo as he was in England at the time) and told him that he felt that they should seriously think about using the V12 instead of the V8.

The potential for the car and engine was there for all to see. According to former McLaren and now Pratt & Miller engineer Ian Wright in 2015, "When the Lamborghini engine was bolted onto the MP4/8 it did not go any quicker, so some downforce was added to enable the extra power to be used. Had the MP4/8 had the Lamborghini engine on the back instead of the Ford it would have had the pace to win the '93 championship comfortably."

In late 1993, Senna had already signed for Williams for the 1994 season; 20 years later,  Dennis revealed that Senna would have remained with McLaren had McLaren signed Peugeot earlier (as he believed a 'works' partnership to be essential to success in F1), but felt obligated to stay with Williams. At the time, it was speculated that Senna believed that despite Peugeot's recent success with its 3.5 litre V10 in endurance sports car racing, having won Le Mans in 1992 and 1993 as well as the 1992 World Sportscar Championship, the engine would not stand up to the rigors of Formula One where the engines were under high strain and were constantly being pushed to their limits, nor did he believe that the Peugeot engine had enough power to challenge the Renault V10; both beliefs were proven correct over the course of the 1994 season. The McLaren MP4/9 Peugeot which followed was closely based on its predecessor, but was not as successful as the engines proved woefully unreliable (eventually becoming infamous for failing spectacularly) and promised development from Peugeot never eventuated. Following Senna's win in Australia, McLaren would not score another until four years later at the 1997 Australian Grand Prix, which was won by David Coulthard in the MP4/12.

Complete Formula One results
(key) (Results in bold indicate pole position; results in italics indicate fastest lap)

References

1993 Formula One season cars
McLaren MP4 08